Gymnetina cretacea is a species of scarab beetle in the family Scarabaeidae.

Subspecies
These two subspecies belong to the species Gymnetina cretacea:
 Gymnetina cretacea cretacea
 Gymnetina cretacea sundbergi Ratcliffe & Warner, 2011

References

Further reading

 
 

Cetoniinae
Articles created by Qbugbot
Beetles described in 1866